Jeannot Esua (born 8 August 1996) is a Cameroonian professional footballer who plays as a right-back for Canadian club FC Edmonton.

Club career

Orange County SC
On 5 June 2017, Esua joined United Soccer League club Orange County SC from Cameroonian side Rainbow Bamenda. He made eleven league appearances that season, scoring one goal.

FC Edmonton
On 22 February 2019, Esua signed with Canadian Premier League side FC Edmonton. He made 21 league appearances that season and two in the Canadian Championship. Esua was subsequently named the club's Player of the Year by the staff and players. On 27 November 2019, Esua re-signed with Edmonton for the 2020 season. He signed a further deal for the 2021 season in December 2020.

Honours
Individual
FC Edmonton Player of the Year: 2019

References

External links

1996 births
Living people
Association football defenders
Cameroonian footballers
Cameroonian expatriate footballers
Expatriate soccer players in the United States
Cameroonian expatriate sportspeople in the United States
Expatriate soccer players in Canada
Cameroonian expatriate sportspeople in Canada
Rainbow FC (Cameroon) players
Orange County SC players
FC Edmonton players
USL Championship players
Canadian Premier League players